Grant Monroe Hermanns (born March 5, 1998) is an American football offensive lineman for the Tampa Bay Buccaneers of the National Football League (NFL).

Early life and high school
Hermanns was born on March 5, 1998, and grew up in Albuquerque, New Mexico. He attended Rio Rancho High School, and was a four-year letter winner. In 2013, he won first place at the high school research exposition in chemistry/biochemistry. As a junior and senior, in football, he earned All-Metro honors from the Albuquerque Football Coaches Association and All-State from the New Mexico Coaches Association. His team won the 2014 New Mexico 6A state championship after compiling an undefeated 13–0 record.

Staph infection
In hopes of improving his chances of being recruited to a Division I school, Hermanns participated in several combines entering his senior year. During the 40-yard dash, he suffered a hip avulsion fracture, but nonetheless continued and finished the combine. The fracture resulted in him missing several football games. He eventually recovered and played in six matches of the season, and performed well enough that he was given all-metro and all-state honors.

"But then I started getting these weird fevers," he later said. I would be at 104 degrees just randomly or I'd go all the way down to 94, a sub-fever. And it would happen all the time, like every other day. I'd be falling asleep in class, just covered in sweat. My parents didn't know what was going on and they took me to the doctor multiple times. The doctor said, 'You're fine, nothing's wrong.' They tested my white cell count and they couldn't find anything.

His mother brought him to a physical therapist, and when asked to sit on the table, his left hip was elevated much higher than his right. "They were like, 'Oh, that's not right,'" he recalled.

At the next day's football practice, Hermanns believed in the bathroom he was urinating blood. Later, it was discovered that it was his liver enzymes exiting his body, meaning that it was deteriorating due to an illness. He was immediately brought to the emergency room, where an MRI discovered a pomegranate-sized cyst located in his hip. His cyst was removed the next day through surgery.

Doctors told Hermanns and his family that the staph infection may have resulted from a cut received during a football game. He was told that it had entered his hip and started attacking his body in the subsequent months. They also said that if he had been several years older, the infection may have been fatal, as it is better handled by younger patients.

Hermanns lost feeling in a section of his left leg, as well as his left foot, after the surgery; one spot is still numb due to nerve damage resulting from the infection. He had to re-learn walking, but within time got closer to normal. As the football season had stopped by this time, Hermanns focused his efforts on wrestling. Just a couple months after the near-fatal staph infection, Hermanns entered the New Mexico Class 6A State Wrestling Championships and won the heavyweight division.

College career
After graduating from Rio Rancho, Hermanns committed to Purdue University over offers from at least eleven other schools, including New Mexico. He redshirted his first year, 2016. He added 40 pounds in 2017, and, despite being a redshirt-freshman, made the Boilermakers' starting lineup. That year, he started the first six matches before suffering a season-ending knee injury. He helped block for a total of 403.1 yards offense a game and was named a 2017 Academic All-Big Ten Conference selection.

As a sophomore in 2018, Hermanns appeared in nine games, all as a starter, and was named an Academic All-Big Ten selection. He helped block for the Purdue offense which averaged over 440 yards of offense each game. He was named team captain for his junior year, 2019, and started all 12 games, earning Academic All-Big Ten honors while helping the team compile an average of 393.2 yards of offense per game. As a senior, Hermanns started all six games of Purdue's COVID shortened season, was named team captain, received his fourth Academic All-Big Ten Conference selection and an Honorable Mention All-Big Ten conference player.

All college players were given an extra year of eligibility due to the COVID-19 pandemic. Despite being eligible for one additional season due to this, Hermanns decided to declare for the NFL Draft. He finished his four-year career at Purdue with a total of 33 games played, all at the left tackle position.

Professional career

New York Jets
Hermanns signed with the New York Jets as an undrafted free agent following the 2021 NFL Draft. He was waived at the final roster cuts, on August 31, but re-signed to the practice squad the next day. He was signed to a future contract on January 10, 2022, after spending the whole  season on the practice squad.

In the  preseason, Hermanns played in all three games and appeared on 78 offensive snaps, as well as ten special teams snaps. He was waived on August 30, 2022, at the final roster cuts, but was subsequently re-signed to the practice squad. He was activated from the practice squad on September 10, for their game against the Baltimore Ravens, and reverted back afterwards. He was again activated on September 17, for New York's game against the Cleveland Browns, and made his NFL debut in the match, a 31–30 win, appearing on five special teams snaps. He was activated for a third time on October 1, against the Pittsburgh Steelers, taking two special teams snaps. He was released on October 11, 2022.

Miami Dolphins
On October 26, 2022, Hermanns was signed to the Miami Dolphins practice squad. He was released on November 28, 2022.

Tampa Bay Buccaneers
On December 7, 2022, Hermanns was signed to the Tampa Bay Buccaneers practice squad. He signed a reserve/future contract on January 17, 2023.

References

Notes

Citations

1998 births
Living people
Players of American football from New Mexico
Sportspeople from Albuquerque, New Mexico
American football offensive linemen
Purdue Boilermakers football players
New York Jets players
Miami Dolphins players
Tampa Bay Buccaneers players